This is a list of rectors of the University of Paris (the Sorbonne), a foundation of the middle of the twelfth century with a charter from 1200. The office of rector emerged in the middle of the thirteenth century. Since the rector, initially the "rector of the nations", was elected by the students and faculty, his position was very different from the appointed chancellor of the university (who was in fact the ecclesiastical chancellor of Notre Dame de Paris, whose power came to be divided also with the chancellor of the Abbey of St Genevieve). The rector became the representative of the faculty of the arts; it required another century for the recognition of the rector as representing also the other three faculties (law, medicine and theology). From the middle of the fourteenth century the rector had the status of head of the university, but limited powers.

The rectorship for most of its history was an elected position, of high academic prestige, and held in practice for a single term of one year. The formal position was that the term was of three months, so in some years there were several rectors elected. In the medieval and early Renaissance periods many holders of the post were from outside France. The reorganization of 1970 divided the historical university into thirteen parts. The office of rector still exists, with title Recteur de l'Académie de Paris.

13th century
 Guillaume de Saint-Amour
 1271 Alberic of Reims (election disputed, and a chaotic period of opposition by Siger of Brabant follows)
 1275 Peter of Auvergne
 1296 Peter of Auvergne

14th century
 1304 Guillelmus Brito
 1313 Marsilius of Padua
 1326 Petrus de Dacia
 1327 Jean Buridan
 1340 Jean Buridan (second term)
 1348 Olivier Saladin, bishop of Nantes
 1350 Jean de Muris
 1351 Jean Diacre
 1353 Albert of Saxony
 1355 Vojtěch Raňkův of Ježov
 1367 Marsilius of Inghen
 1371 Marsilius of Inghen (second term)
 1378 Guillaume Gorran
 1381 Mathieu Regnauld
 1383 Jean Voignon
 1393-5 Mathieu-Nicolas Poillevillain de Clémanges (Nicholas of Clamanges)
 1395 (October–December), Walter Forrester (future bishop of Brechin)

15th century
 1401 (June) Jacques de Nouvion
 1403 Pierre Cauchon
 1405 Gérard de Machet
 1409 Jean de Beaumont
 1412 Jean Beaupère
 1428 Pierre Maurice
 1430 Thomas de Courcelles
 1435 Olavi Maununpoika (Olavus Magni), bishop of Turku
 1439 Guillaume Bouillé
 1442 Jehan Pluyette
 1448 Jehan Pluyette
 1458 Johannes Versoris
 1467 Guillaume Fichet
 1468 Johannes Heynlin known as De La Pierre or Lapidanus
 1469 John Ireland
 1473 Cantien Hue
 1479 Martin de Delft
 1485 Jan Standonck
 1485 (October–December) Johannes Molitor
 1486 Gillis van Delft
 1489 Jean Lanternant, Johann Lantmann
 1491 Guillaume Cappel
 1492 Bernard Roillet
 1494 Adam Pluyette

16th century
 1507-8 Jacques Almain
 1513 Girolamo Aleandro
 1514? Gilles de Maizières (Aegidius Maserius)
 1519 Jean Finet
 1519 Gervasius Waim
 1520 Jean Tixier de Ravisi (c. 1480–1524)
 1525 William Manderston
 1528 (March–June) Nicholas Boissel
 1528 Bertinus Myss
 1531 Landéric Maciot
 1531 Jean de Gagny
 1533 Nicolas Cop
 1534 André de Gouveia
 1539 Antoine de Mouchy
 1540 Claude D'Espence
 1540 Simon Vigor
 1560 Claude Roillet
 1564 Michel Marescot
 1581 Jean Boucher
 1584 John Hamilton
 1586 Jean Filesac
 1594 Jacques d'Amboise
 Guillaume Rose, bishop of Senlis
 Guy de Saint-Paul
 1596-1600 John Fraser clerical prior of Beauly Priory 1573–1579, Abbot of Noyon France 1580–1590, Bn 1544, Philorth, Scotland, unanimously elected Rector

17th century
 1600-9 John Fraser died 15/16 April (Easter Sunday) 1609 : buried at the Church of the Franciscans, Paris, France
 1646-8 Godefroy Hermant
 1694 Charles Rollin

18th century
 1701 Micheál Ó Mordha (Michael Moore, orMoor)
 Guillaume Dagomer
 1707-8 Balthazar Gibert, also 1721–3, 1733-6
 1713, 1717 Michel Godeau
 Edmond Pourchot, seven times rector
 1719 Charles Rollin (second term)
 1748 Jean-Baptiste Cochet
 1789 Jean-Baptiste Dumouchel, constitutional bishop of Nîmes in 1790

Notes

Paris, Rectors of the University of Paris
 
Paris-related lists